Golemo Bucino is a village in Southern Bulgaria. The village is located in Pernik Municipality, Pernik Province. Аccording to the numbers provided by the 2020 Bulgarian census, Ciuipetlovo currently has a population of 660 people with a permanent address registration in the settlement.

Geography 
Golemo Bucino is located in the foot of Lyulin mountain. Highway Trakia passes closely to the village. It is located 18 kilometers away from Sofia. 

The air is clean mainly due to a mountain air current passing through the village.

Culture and Infrastructure 
There is a monastery 1 kilometer away from the village. The Golemobucinski monastery “Vaznesenie Gospodne” dates back to the 18th century. It was partly renovated in the 19th century.

Buildings 

 The community hall and library “Lyulinski Izgrev 1903” was built in 1903
 The church “Sveti Duh” was built in 2006 with donations from the villager

Ethnicity 
According to the Bulgarian population census in 2011.

References 

Villages in Pernik Province